Nobu is a unisex given name. Notable people with this name include:

 Nobu Hayashi (born 1978), Japanese karateka and kickboxer
 Nobu Jo (1872–1959), Japanese Christian philanthropist
 Nobu Kōda (1870–1946), Japanese composer, violinist, and music teacher
 Nobu Matsuhisa (born 1949), Japanese celebrity chef
 Nobu McCarthy (1934–2002), Japanese-Canadian actress, fashion model, and stage director
 Nobu Naruse (born 1984), Japanese cross-country skier
 Nobu Shirase (1861–1946), Japanese army officer and explorer
 Nobu Su, Chinese businessman
 Nobu Tamura, French-born Japanese-American paleoartist and physicist
 Nobu and Mio Adilman, Canadian television personalities
 Nobuko Tsuchiura
 Nobuyuki Siraisi (1934–2016), artist and designer
 Nobuyuki Tsujii, Japanese pianist and composer

Japanese unisex given names